Dębczyn  is a settlement in the administrative district of Gmina Sława, within Wschowa County, Lubusz Voivodeship, in western Poland.

References

Villages in Wschowa County